Edward A. Reynolds West Side High School is a New York City public alternative high school located on the Upper West Side of Manhattan.  Known for many years simply as "West Side High," it was renamed in honor of the school's longtime principal following his unexpected death in 2001.

History 

Regular planning for West Side High School began during the summer of 1972, with a few adults and a group of young students from local public junior high schools, primarily from Booker T. Washington Jr. HS 54 and Jr. HS 44 on West 77th Street.  When school was out that year, the summer planning phase for West Side High School began. Students and adults met five days a week to plan for the new school program.  In addition to regular day-long planning, the staff and students attended evening meetings with the community to justify the program, bolster support, and try to gain approval; some members of the nearby community were not welcoming.  The meetings were video taped, though no tapes have yet surfaced.  Approval from the New York City Board of Education was granted during a NYC School Board public meeting.  The first classes were in the Fall of 1972.

West Side High was designed to be an alternative public school providing something more than the typical public high school fare.  Early on, the school had 100 students, three full-time teachers, and a dedicated office manager, Doris Rosenblum. Directors and other staff members who were connected with the school in those first years, planning, operating and teaching in the school, were Michael Levien, Mike Bettinger, and Bob Lefcourt.  By the mid 1970s, the population of the school was about 125 students, which grew to 325 in 1980, and to 500 by the 1990s.

In the 1970s, West Side High was an experiment in several philosophies of educational thinking. Its students were a mix of all types of students from both local public and private schools.  There were disaffected youth and those who did not fit into traditional high school settings, as well as students kicked out of programs at other school and deemed "troubled kids." West Side High Schools teachers and curriculum were considered to be extremely liberal and experimental by some of the community members who regularly attended planning meetings and had their voices heard. The program was designed by, and operated around, a core group of students and adults.  The school was used as a place for students from all over the city who were kicked out of other schools and programs.

In addition to the standard course requirements of all New York City public schools, (urban studies, liberal arts and the various sciences) alternative courses in cultural diversity, non-violent coping skills, and modern politics were taught. During the first few years the school was located in on the Upper West Side of Manhattan on West 93rd Street, west of Broadway.  Early on, students created programs in which they worked off-site for part of the day at the Metropolitan Museum of Art, Pace University, The New School for Social Research, the Ben Fernandez School of Photography, and other organizations and institutions.  The first graduation consisted of just a few students, and took place on the street in front of the West 93rd Street building in June 1975.

West Side High School moved to its current address at 140 West 102nd Street in 1981 when the Board of Education lost its lease to the 93rd Street building.  The school moved into an old elementary school building at 140 West 102nd Street, which was converted into an Alternative High Schools building for use by West Side, along with two other alternative public high school programs.  In the late 1980s, the building, which dated from the late 1800s, was condemned, and the school moved into an office building on West 35th Street and 8th Avenue.  After eight years at the 35th Street site, West Side returned to a new building built by the New York City Department of Education on the same site at 140 West 102nd Street.

Principal 

Edward A. Reynolds (known as "Ed" to students and staff) took over as Director in 1975, and served as Director and Principal of West Side High School for more than 25 years, until his sudden death in 2001.

External links 
 Official Website of Edward A. Reynolds West Side High School
 Ed Reynolds and PSAL

Public high schools in Manhattan
Alternative schools in the United States